Clepsis taima is a species of moth of the family Tortricidae. It is found in Rio Grande do Sul, Brazil.

References

Moths described in 2003
Clepsis